Catagonia is a genus of flies in the family Tachinidae.

Species
Catagonia aberrans (Rondani, 1859)

Distribution
Czech Republic, Hungary, Latvia, Romania, Slovakia, Ukraine, Bosnia & Herzegovina, Bulgaria, Croatia, Greece, Italy, Serbia, Slovenia, Austria, Belgium, France, Germany, Netherlands, Switzerland, Japan, China.

References

Tachinidae genera
Exoristinae
Monotypic Brachycera genera
Taxa named by Friedrich Moritz Brauer
Taxa named by Julius von Bergenstamm
Diptera of Europe
Diptera of Asia